Anim Synagogue, a  drive away northwest of Arad, was an ancient synagogue in use during the 4th–7th centuries CE. The site is recognized as a National Heritage Site of Israel. It is located in the Yatir Forest, immediately south of the Green Line, in Israel.

History

The synagogue is located at an ancient site identified with the Anim mentioned in the Bible. It is also believed to be the site of the large Jewish village of Anaya during the Roman-Byzantine period. Eusebius mentions the same village in his Onomasticon as being one of two villages in his day, located south of Hebron, and bearing the same name. One of the two villages, he writes, had a settlement of Jews, while the other, of Christians. 

The synagogue was discovered during an excavation conducted in 1987. Evidence of a mosaic floor was found beneath the current stone slab flooring and fragments of an inscription remain. The building functioned as a synagogue until the seventh or eighth century when it was turned into a mosque.

The site of the ancient Jewish village is now known as Lower Horvat Anim (Khirbet Ghuwein et-Taḥta) (grid position 156/084PAL), with a neighbouring contemporary Christian village at Upper Horvat Anim (Khirbet Ghuwein al-Fauqa) just 2 km northeast from it. Ben-Yosef places the site of the Upper Horvat Anim at a distance of 5 km northeast of the lower site (grid position 1583/0855PAL). Excavations at Upper Horvat Anim have uncovered the remains of a larger regional Byzantine church outside the village, overlooking it from the hill to the east and joined to it by a pathway - a configuration repeatedly met in the Southern Hebron Hills.

Rabbi Shimon ben Yehudah, mentioned in Pesikta Rabbati, came from the village of Anim.

See also
Ancient synagogues in Israel
Ancient synagogues in the Palestine region
Archaeology of Israel

References

External links
The Design of the Ancient synagogues in Judea: Horvat Ma’on and Horvat ‘Anim, by D. Chen & D. Milson.

Ancient synagogues in the Land of Israel
Archaeological sites in Israel
Mosques converted from synagogues
8th-century mosques
4th-century synagogues
8th-century disestablishments in the Abbasid Caliphate
Ancient Jewish settlements of Judaea
he:חורבת ענים#בית הכנסת